The following is a list of managers of Crystal Palace Football Club from the beginning of the club's official managerial records in 1905 to the present day. Each manager's entry includes the dates of his tenure and the club's overall competitive record (in terms of matches won, drawn and lost).

The most successful manager of Crystal Palace is Steve Coppell, who during his 13-year reign as manager took the club to an FA Cup Final, third place in the top flight, won the Full Members Cup and were also twice second tier play-off winners. He is also the club's second longest-serving manager, presiding over a total of 565 games from 1984 to 2000 (over four spells). In 2005, he was voted as the manager for Palace's Centenary XI.

Key
 All first-team matches in national competition are counted, except the abandoned 1939–40 Football League season and matches in wartime leagues and cups
 Names of caretaker managers are supplied where known and marked 
 Names of player-managers are marked 
 Win percentage is rounded to two decimal places

Managers
Statistics are complete up to and including the match played 15 March 2023.

Notes

External links
Crystal Palace's official website

Managers
 
Crystal Palace